The Cochylini are a tribe of tortrix moths. It used to be classified as the subfamily Cochylinae.

Diversity
The tribe contains about 1,000 described species in about 80 genera.

Distribution
Members of the tribe are present worldwide, but the greatest number of species occurs in the Holarctic realm and Neotropical realm.

Biology
Larvae are mostly internal feeders in seeds, stalks and roots.

Taxonomy
Research by Regier et al. in 2012 provided fairly convincing evidence that Cochylini are a monophyletic lineage within a broader Euliini. If this is accepted, Cochylini should be treated as subtribe Cochylina of Euliini.

Genera

Selected unplaced species
Phalonia pimana Busck, 1907
Phalonia yuccatana Busck, 1907

Former genera
Carolella
Platphalonidia
Rolandylis
Thyraylia
Trachybyrsis

References

 , 2010: Review of East African Cochylini (Lepidoptera, Tortricidae) with description of new species. Norwegian Journal of Entomology 57 (2): 81-108. Abstract: .
  2009: Synopsis of the Cochylini (Tortricidae: Tortricinae: Cochylini) of Iran, with the description of a new species. Zootaxa, 2245: 1-31. Abstract & excerpt
 , 2005: World catalogue of insects volume 5 Tortricidae.
 , 2011: Diagnoses and remarks on genera of Tortricidae, 2: Cochylini (Lepidoptera: Tortricidae). Shilap Revista de Lepidopterologia 39 (156): 397-414.
 , 2008: Tortricidae from the mountains of Ecuador. Part III. Western Cordillera (Insecta: Lepidoptera). Genus 19 (3): 497-575. Full article: 
 , 2010: Systematic and faunistic data on Neotropical Cochylini (Lepidoptera: Tortricidae), with descriptions of new species: Part 4. Polish Journal of Entomology 79 (4): 
 , 2010: Tortricidae (Lepidoptera) from Peru. Acta Zoologica Cracoviensia 53B (1-2): 73-159. . Full article:  .
  2010: An annotated catalogue of the types of Tortricidae (Lepidoptera) in the collection of the Royal Museum for Central Africa (Tervuren, Belgium) with descriptions of new genera and new species. Zootaxa 2469: 1-77. Abstract: .

 
Moth tribes